Michael Thomas Quade (born 16 September 1944) is a former Australian rules footballer who played with North Melbourne in the Victorian Football League (VFL).

He played over a period of three seasons for North Melbourne as a Ruckman.  Due to a persistent leg injury he was forced to retire early in his playing career.  Quade is the brother of VFL footballers Tom Quade and Ricky Quade.

Notes

External links 

Living people
1944 births
Australian rules footballers from New South Wales
North Melbourne Football Club players